The discography of Victoria Beckham, an English pop music singer, consists of one studio album, two cancelled albums, five singles, five music videos and one DVD. On 14 August 2000, Beckham released her first solo single, "Out of Your Mind" in collaboration with Dane Bowers and Truesteppers, which debuted at number 2 in the UK Singles Chart. Before the single's release, on 8 July 2000, Beckham made her public solo debut at London's Hyde Park at a concert to raise money for the Prince's Trust charity. She sang "Out of Your Mind" to a 100,000-strong audience. Beckham then signed a recording contract with the Spice Girls' label Virgin Records. Her next single as a solo artist, "Not Such an Innocent Girl", was released on 17 September 2001. Again, she faced competition in another hugely hyped chart battle, this time with Kylie Minogue's single "Can't Get You Out of My Head". Despite a huge promotional campaign, Beckham was outsold eight to one, and her single debuted at number 6. Beckham's eponymous debut album, which was released on 1 October 2001, reached number 10 in the UK Albums Chart. The album cost a reputed £5 million to produce and it sold a modest 100,000 copies. The second and final single to be released from the album was "A Mind of Its Own" on 11 February 2002. The single reached number 6 in the UK and sold 56,500 copies. A third single, "I Wish", was promoted but never materialised.

In 2002, Telstar Records signed Beckham in a deal made with 19 Management worth £1.5 million. In 2003 Beckham's first single with Telstar, "Let Your Head Go / This Groove", was released in the UK on 29 December 2003 and charted at number 3. Beckham spent much of that year recording two pop/urban-influenced albums called Open Your Eyes and Come Together. These albums never materialised, and amidst the collapse of Telstar and bankruptcy of the label, remaining plans for Beckham's music career were shelved and cancelled. All promotional albums and tracks have been leaked and are available on YouTube and various sources online.

Albums

Studio album

Video album

Unreleased albums

Singles

As main artist

As featured artist

Promotional singles

Other appearances

Music videos

References

External links

Discographies of British artists
Pop music discographies
Victoria Beckham